Amiri-ye Sofla (also Romanized as Amīrī-ye Soflá; also known as Amīrī-ye Pā‘īn) is a village in Rig Rural District, in the Central District of Lordegan County, Chaharmahal and Bakhtiari Province, Iran. At the 2006 census, its population was 480, in 88 families.

References 

Populated places in Lordegan County